Walter E. Cooke (November 22, 1910 – December 31, 1982) was an American politician from New York.

Life
He was born on November 22, 1910, in Brooklyn, New York City. He married Lillian Reilly, and they had three daughters.

Cooke was a member of the New York State Assembly (Kings Co., 10th D.) in 1943 and 1944. In November 1944, he ran for re-election but was defeated by Republican Lewis W. Olliffe.

He was a member of the New York State Senate (11th D.) from 1955 to 1964, sitting in the 170th, 171st, 172nd, 173rd and 174th New York State Legislature.

He was again a member of the State Assembly in 1965. 
 
He died on December 31, 1982, in Community Hospital in Brooklyn.

Sources

1910 births
1982 deaths
Politicians from Brooklyn
Democratic Party New York (state) state senators
Democratic Party members of the New York State Assembly
20th-century American politicians